Julio Llamazares (born March 28, 1955) is a Spanish author born in Vegamián, León Province.

Biography

Julio Llamazares is a poet, novelist and a prolific essayist and journalist. He focuses on themes such as the history and memory of Spanish society, both individual and collective and, in particular, the progressive decline of the rural cultural heritage. His work encompasses multiple genres, including 6 novels as well as various collections of poems, short stories and essays, travel writing, screenplays and journalism. He has had a regular column in El País since the early 1980s and has been featured on radio and TV.

His first works were two collections of poetry: La lentitud de los bueyes, first published in 1979 and La memoria de la nieve, published in 1982.

His first novel, Luna de lobos, was published in 1985 and made into a film in 1987, directed by Julio Sánchez Valdés, with a cast including Santiago Ramos, Antonio Resines and Kiti Mánver.  It relates the story of a group of four fugitives caught on the wrong side of enemy lines in the early days of the Spanish civil war, who held out for nine years hiding in the Cantabrian mountains in attempt to avoid the savage Nationalist repression. It has recently been translated into English and published as Wolf Moon. In the words of Dr Chris Bannister, writing for the Arts & Humanities Research Council, “Wolf Moon is a moving account of the horrors of Francoism and the pressures the dictatorship exerted upon those that lived under it.” 

His second novel, La Lluvia amarilla, was published in 1988 (translated into English and published as The Yellow Rain), relates the story of the last inhabitant of Ainielle, a village in the province of Huesca in the Spanish Pyrenees, now abandoned and in ruins.

For many years Llamazares has indicated that he does not wish his publications to be considered for any further prizes. In 2016, he respectfully withdrew his most recent novel, Distintas formas de mirar el agua, from the short list for the Premio de la Crítica de Castilla y León (Castilla & Leon Critics' Prize).

Works
Narrative
Luna de lobos (1985), novel
La lluvia amarilla (1988), novel
Escenas del cine mudo (1994), novel
En mitad de ninguna parte (1995), stories
Tres historias verdaderas (1998), stories
El cielo de Madrid (2005), novel
Las lágrimas de San Lorenzo (2013), novel
Distintas formas de mirar el agua (2015), novel

Poetry
La lentitud de los bueyes (1979)
Memoria de la nieve (1982)
Versos y Ortigas: 1973-2008 (2009)

Essays and Articles
El entierro de Genarín: Evangelio apócrifo del último heterodoxo español (1981)
En Babia (1991), newspaper articles
Nadie escucha (1995), newspaper articles
En mitad de ninguna parte (1995), newspaper articles
Los viajeros de Madrid (1998), newspaper articles
Modernos y elegantes (2006), newspaper articles
Entre perro y lobo (2008), newspaper articles

Travel writing
El río del olvido (1990)
Trás-os-montes (1998)
Cuaderno del Duero (1999)
Las rosas de piedra (2008)
Atlas de la España imaginaria (2015)
El viaje de Don Quijote (2016)
Las rosas del sur (2018)

Screenplays
Retrato de un bañista (1984)
Luna de lobos (1987)
El techo del mundo (1995)
Flores de otro mundo (1999)

Anthology
Antología y Voz; El Búho Viajero (2007)

Other
Historia de una pasión included in Cristina García Rodero Second edition (2008). .

Translations into English 
Narrative
 The Yellow Rain (La lluvia amarilla) translated by Margaret Jull Costa, Harvill Press (2003) 
 Wolf Moon (Luna de lobos) translated by Simon Deefholts & Kathryn Phillips-Miles, Peter Owen Publishers/Istros Books, (2017) 
Essays & Articles
 My childhood hero has died (Muere el héroe de mi infancia) translated by Simon Deefholts & Kathryn Phillips-Miles, included as Afterword in Wolf Moon, Peter Owen Publishers/Istros Books, (2017).  Original article published in La Crónica de León, 06 Jun 2004 and reproduced in Entre Perro y Lobo (2008).
 Postmemory (La posmemoria) translated by Simon Deefholts & Kathryn Phillips-Miles, published on Peter Owen Publishers website (2017). Original article published in El País 29 Nov 2006.

Awards
1978: Premio Antonio González de Lama.
1982: Premio Jorge Guillén.
1983: Premio Ícaro.
1992: Premio de Periodismo El Correo Español-El pueblo vasco.
1993: Premio Nonino.
1994: Premio Cardo d’Oro.
1994: Premio ITAS del libro dei montagni.
1999: "Best film" in International Critics’ Week at the Cannes International Festival, jointly with Icíar Bollaín.

References

Further reading
AA.VV., El universo de Julio Llamazares. Cuadernos de narrativa 3, Neuchâtel, Université de Neuchâtel, 1998.
ALLES, Lisbeth Korthals, y MONTFRANS, Manet van, New Georgics: Rural and Regional Motifs in the Contemporary European Novel, Rodopi: Amsterdam, 2002.
CARLÓN, José, Sobre la nieve: la poesía y la prosa de Julio Llamazares, Madrid, Espasa, 1996.
VERES, Luis, "Intertextualidad narrativa en los cuentos de Julio Llamazares", Espéculo, 19 (2001-2002).

External links
 Interview with Julio Llamazares
https://www.peterowen.com/julio-llamazares-postmemory/
https://www.elpais.com/autor/julio_llamazares/a
http://eurolitnetwork.com/from-wolf-moon-by-julio-llamazares-translated-by/

1955 births
Living people
People from Montaña de Riaño
Spanish journalists
20th-century Spanish poets
20th-century Spanish novelists
21st-century Spanish novelists
20th-century travel writers
21st-century travel writers
Spanish travel writers
Spanish male screenwriters
Spanish male novelists
Spanish male poets
20th-century Spanish screenwriters
20th-century Spanish male writers
21st-century Spanish screenwriters
El País columnists